Myelin oligodendrocyte glycoprotein (MOG) is a glycoprotein believed to be important in the myelination of nerves in the central nervous system (CNS).  In humans this protein is encoded by the MOG gene.  It is speculated to serve as a necessary "adhesion molecule" to provide structural integrity to the myelin sheath and is known to develop late on the oligodendrocyte.

Molecular function 
While the primary molecular function of MOG is not yet known, its likely role with the myelin sheath is either in sheath "completion and/or maintenance".  More specifically, MOG is speculated to be "necessary" as an "adhesion molecule" on the myelin sheath of the CNS to provide the structural integrity of the myelin sheath."

MOG's cDNA coding region in humans have been shown to be "highly homologous" to rats, mice, and bovine, and hence highly conserved.  This suggests "an important biological role for this protein".

Physiology 
The gene for MOG, found on chromosome 6 p21.3-p22, was first sequenced in 1995.  It is a transmembrane protein expressed on the surface of oligodendrocyte cell and on the outermost surface of myelin sheaths.  "MOG is a quantitatively minor type I transmembrane protein, and is found exclusively in the CNS.  "A single Ig-domain is exposed to the extracellular space" and consequently allows autoantibodies easy access. and therefore is easily accessible to autoantibodies too. The MOG "primary nuclear transcript … is 15,561 nucleotides in length" and, for humans, it has eight exons which are "separated by seven introns".  The introns "contain numerous  DNA" sequences, among which are "14 Alu sequences within 3 introns", and have a range varying from 242 to 6484 bp.

Structure
Alternatively spliced human mRNA of the MOG gene form at least nine isoforms.

The crystal structure of myelin oligodendrocyte glycoprotein was determined by x-ray diffraction at a resolution of 1.45 Angstroms, using protein from the Norway rat.  This protein is 139 residues long, and is a member of the immunoglobulin superfamily. The dssp secondary structure of the protein is 6% helical and 43% beta sheet:  there are three short helical segments and ten beta strands.  The beta strands are within two antiparallel beta sheets that form an immunoglobulin-like beta-sandwich fold.  Several features of the protein structure suggest MOG has a role as an "adhesin in the completion and/or compaction of the myelin sheath." There is a "significant strip" of electronegative charge beginning near the N-terminus and running about half the length of the molecule.  Also, MOG was shown to dimerize in solution, and the shape complementarity index is high at the dimer interface, suggesting a "biologically relevant MOG dimer."

Synthesis
Developmentally, MOG is formed "very late on oligodendrocytes and the myelin sheath".

Role in disease

Non-inflammatory demyelinating diseases
Interest in MOG has centered on its role in demyelinating diseases. Some of them are not-inflammatory, such as adrenoleukodystrophy, vanishing white matter disease, and Rubella induced mental retardation.

Anti-MOG associated inflammatory demyelinating diseases

MOG has received much of its laboratory attention in studies dealing with MS. Several studies have shown a role for antibodies against MOG in the pathogenesis of MS, though most of them were written before the discovery of NMO-IgG and the NMO spectrum of diseases.

Anti-MOG status is different depending whether it is measured by ELISA or by microarray (CBA). The proper way to identify it is by microarray, reacting patient serum with living cells, and detecting the binding IgG via a fluorescent-labeled secondary antibody.

In animal models
Animal models of MS, namely Experimental Autoimmune Encephalomyelitis(EAE) models, have shown that "MOG-specific EAE models (of different animal strains) display/mirror human multiple sclerosis", but basically explains the part involved in the optic neuritis. These models with anti-MOG antibodies have been investigated extensively and are considered the only antibodies with demyelinating capacity but again, EAE pathology is closer to NMO and ADEM than to the confluent demyelination observed in MS.

Anti-MOG antibodies have been shown to behave similarly to AQP4 antibodies in animal models, and are considered a biomarker against the MS diagnosis

In seronegative neuromyelitis optica

Anti-MOG autoimmunity has been found to be involved in most AQP4-seronegative NMO and also in optic neuritis and some fulminant forms of ADEM. MOG antibodies in NMOSD are variable depending on the seropositivity status.

In other conditions

The presence of anti-MOG autoantibodies has been associated with the following conditions

 Most cases of aquaporin-4-seronegative neuromyelitis optica: NMO derived from an antiMOG associated encephalomyelitis,
 Some cases of acute disseminated encephalomyelitis, specially the recurrent ones (MDEM) and the fulminant courses
 Some cases of multiple sclerosis
 isolated optic neuritis or transverse myelitis

References

External links 
 
 

Glycoproteins